Berkshire High School is a public high school in Burton, Ohio that serves Burton Township, Geauga County, Ohio; Thompson Township, Geauga County, Ohio; Montville Township, Geauga County, Ohio; Claridon Township, Geauga County, Ohio; and Troy Township, Geauga County, Ohio.  It is the only high school in the Berkshire School District and its mascot is the Badger.

Prior to consolidation, the school was known as Burton High School and its mascot was the Maple Leaf. The Bershire School District opened the current K-12 campus in the fall of 2022.  Unlike most high schools, the Berkshire  School campus consists of all grades from pre K to 12 and is located adjacent to Kent State University-Geauga Campus. The previous location of Berkshire High School has been sold and is the former residence of Seabury Ford, governor of Ohio.  

Berkshire High School as of 2015 now includes students from Ledgemont High School, as Ledgemont closed their high school and the elementary closed with he opening of the new Berkshire Local Schools Pre K through 12 campus.

Elementary school closings
 Burton Elementary 2022
 Ledgemont Elementary 2022
 Claridon Elementary School- 2005
 Troy Elementary School- 2009

Notable alumni
 Dan Taylor, USA Track and Field Athlete, Shot Put - Class of 2000

External links
 District Website
 High School Athletics

Notes and references

High schools in Geauga County, Ohio
Public high schools in Ohio
Public middle schools in Ohio